Linda Helenius (July 5, 1894 in Pöytyä – April 18, 1960 in Helsinki) was a Finnish nurse, missionary and writer. Helenius was among the Finnish Evangelical Lutheran Mission missionaries in Owamboland (modern Namibia and Angola) in 1921–1952. She took a hospital position in the Oukwanyama territory, first at Engela and then Eenhana.

Writings (in Finnish)
 Etelän ristin alla: Kuvauksia lääkärilähetystyöstä Ambomaalla. Kirjoittajat Selma Rainio, Karin Hirn ja Linda Helenius. Suomen lähetysseura, Helsinki 1923
 Orjuuden kahleissa: Ambokristityt portugalilaisten sortamina. Suomen lähetysseura, Helsinki 1928
 Jumalan puutarha: Vaikutelmia työajaltani Ambomaalla. Suomen lähetysseura, Helsinki 1930
 Ambolainen veritodistaja. Suomen lähetysseura, Helsinki 1938
 ”Sillä pimeys katoaa...” Ambopastori Paulus Hamutenjan elämästä ja evankeliumin leviämisestä Uukuanjamaassa. Suomen lähetysseura, Helsinki 1942
 Terveisiä Ambomaalta. Kirjoittajat Anni Melander, Rauha Tamminen, Linda Helenius. WSOY 1942
 Venheestä alloille: Jumalan kätten tekoja Afrikan aarniometsissä. Vivamo-säätiö, Lohja 1957
 Vivamo ja sen asukkaiden vaiheita. Vivamo-säätiö, Lohja 1957.

Sources
Linda Helenius in the writer encyclopaedia of Suomalaisen Kirjallisuuden Seura
Kalliokoski, Ritva: Selma Rainio ensimmäisenä naislääkärinä Ambomaalle Afrikkaan. Lääkärilähetyksen 100-vuotisseminaari 20.9.2008.

1894 births
1960 deaths
People from Pöytyä
People from Turku and Pori Province (Grand Duchy of Finland)
Finnish Lutheran missionaries
Finnish nurses
Lutheran missionaries in Namibia
Christian writers
Finnish expatriates in Namibia
Female Christian missionaries
20th-century Lutherans